The World Trade Center Macau is a trade and convention facility in Macau, China. The 19-story tower and complex was built by Portuguese architect Manuel Vicente and completed in 1996, three years before the handover from the Portuguese back to China.

See also
 Lisboa Hotel
 China Insurance Building, Macau
 China Travel Service Building, Macau

References
 WTC Macau

Macau Peninsula
Skyscrapers in Macau
Buildings and structures in Macau
Landmarks in Macau
Macau
1996 establishments in Macau
Skyscraper office buildings in China